Avren Rocks ( ska-'li a-'vren) are three adjacent rocks situated in the interior of Micalvi Cove in the south extremity of Robert Island, South Shetland Islands. The rocks were first mapped in 2008 by a Bulgarian team. They are named after two settlements in Varna and Kardzhali provinces situated in northeastern and southeastern Bulgaria respectively.

See also 
 Composite Antarctic Gazetteer
 List of Antarctic islands south of 60° S
 SCAR
 Territorial claims in Antarctica

Maps
 L.L. Ivanov et al., Antarctica: Livingston Island and Greenwich Island, South Shetland Islands (from English Strait to Morton Strait, with illustrations and ice-cover distribution), Scale 1: 100000 map, Antarctic Place-names Commission of Bulgaria, Ministry of Foreign Affairs, Sofia, 2005
 L.L. Ivanov. Antarctica: Livingston Island and Greenwich, Robert, Snow and Smith Islands. Scale 1:120000 topographic map. Troyan: Manfred Wörner Foundation, 2009.

References

External links
 Avren Rocks. SCAR Composite Antarctic Gazetteer
 Bulgarian Antarctic Gazetteer. Antarctic Place-names Commission. (details in Bulgarian, basic data in English)

External links
 Avren Rocks. Copernix satellite image

Rock formations of Robert Island
Bulgaria and the Antarctic